La Defense, also known as The Call to Arms, is a sculpture by Auguste Rodin.

History
Rodin created a model for a competition for a monument to the siege of Paris in 1870 during the Franco-Prussian War. It was rejected in favor of a bronze sculpture by Louis-Ernest Barrias. Later, it was enlarged to four times its size to be used as a monument in Verdun.

Description
The bronze sculpture in the Portland Art Museum's Evan H. Roberts Memorial Sculpture Collection was modeled in 1879 and cast c. 1910, and measures 44 in x 23 in x 16 inches.

See also
List of sculptures by Auguste Rodin

References

External links

1879 sculptures
Bronze sculptures in Oregon
Collection of the Portland Art Museum
Sculptures by Auguste Rodin